Rent The Chicken. is an American multinational company that engages in the rental of chickens and incubators. The company is headquartered near Pittsburgh, Pennsylvania in the small town of Freeport. It is the world's largest chicken rental company with farmers participating in more than 30 States and 3 Canadian provinces. The company was founded on September 1st 2013 by Phil and Jenn Tompkins with the mission of "Families helping Families". As of May 2021 Rent The Chicken is the largest chicken rental company in the world.

Media reaction
Various media outlets have interviewed the business throughout the years. Articles include "Curious about raising chickens? This company lets you rent hens for your backyard" from today.com and other outlets such as CHEK News Canada, Pittsburgh Post-Gazette, HuffPost, The New York Times, New York Post, GlobalNews.ca, Daily Mail, ABC 7 Chicago Localish, and many more

References 

Chickens
Poultry companies
2013 establishments in the United States